{{DISPLAYTITLE:C22H27NO2}}
The molecular formula C22H27NO2 (molar mass:  373.91 g/mol, exact mass: 373.180857) may refer to:

 Danazol, an anabolic steroid
 Lobeline
 Pheneridine
 2α-(Propanoyl)-3β-(2-(6-methoxynaphthyl))-tropane
 Ro4-1539, an opioid analgesic